'Thoppur or Thoppur Ghat is a hill town in Dharmapuri district of Tamil Nadu, India. It lies between the city of Salem and the city of Dharmapuri on National Highway 44, at its junction with Mettur Dam Road (SH 20).

Thoppur is known for the Thoppaiyaru Dam, Anjaneyar Koil (Mutthampatty), Rope Winch, and Perumal Kovil (on Vanagunda Hill). Thoppur is the home of the Muslim holy shrine, Hazrath Syed Shah Vali Ulla (known as Thoppur Dargha).

Transport 
Thoppur lies on National Highway 44, a major north-south highway in India. It is also the terminal point of State Highway 20 which connects to the town of Mettur and the city of Erode. The NH-44 , road between Dharmapuri and Thoppur in Tamilnadu is very much prone to fatal accidents due to the poor road design in the hilly slopes.

References 

Villages in Dharmapuri district